Cervical mucus method may refer to a specific method of fertility awareness or natural family planning:

Billings ovulation method
Creighton Model FertilityCare System
Two Day Method